Judith Monteith-Farrell is a Canadian politician, who was elected to the Legislative Assembly of Ontario in the 2018 provincial election. She represented the electoral district of Thunder Bay—Atikokan as a member of the Ontario New Democratic Party until her defeat in the 2022 provincial election.

Electoral record

References

Living people
Ontario New Democratic Party MPPs
Women MPPs in Ontario
21st-century Canadian politicians
21st-century Canadian women politicians
Politicians from Thunder Bay
Year of birth missing (living people)